John Edward Melendez (born October 4, 1965), also known as Stuttering John, is an American radio personality, comedian, singer, actor, television writer, announcer, and podcast host.

He is best known for being on The Howard Stern Show from 1988 to 2004. Initially working as an intern, Melendez became known for asking celebrities impertinent questions at events and press conferences with his stuttering. He left the show to become the announcer on The Tonight Show with Jay Leno and also worked on Leno's later shows. In April 2018, he launched The Stuttering John Podcast.

Early life
Melendez grew up in Massapequa, New York on Long Island and attended Plainedge High School. Melendez was born to a Puerto Rican father and a Danish mother. According to Melendez, he began to stutter when he was in the second grade as a result of psychological mistreatment from his father after he witnessed an argument between his parents. He attended Plainedge High School, where he was picked on by the neighborhood bullies because of his stuttering.

In 1988, Melendez attended New York University's film school and belonged to a band called "Rock Slide." His college roommate, comedian Mitch Fatel, was on the verge of quitting his internship with The Howard Stern Show, when Melendez asked him for a recommendation for an internship there. The show's producer, Gary Dell'Abate, mentioned Melendez's stuttering to Howard Stern who, without seeing him and even before he was interviewed, told the producer to hire him.

Career

1988–2004: The Howard Stern Show
On Stern's show, Melendez's primary role was answering phones and screening listener calls before they were allowed on the air. At the time of his joining, the show had just added Washington, D.C., as its third market in addition to New York City and Philadelphia.

Over time, Melendez became known for segments in which he asked celebrities confrontational questions at red carpet events, functions, promotional appearances, and press conferences. The puerile questions—written by Howard Stern, Fred Norris, and Jackie Martling—centered around a given celebrity's private life and were premised on the idea that they would not want to look bad by refusing an interview from someone who stuttered. Melendez sported long hair and metal T-shirts, asking questions by reading them from a sheet of paper. As he became better known, he occasionally wore a disguise consisting of an overcoat, fedora, and fake mustache. His interviews were characterized by punchline-free "joke" questions, such as asking actress Melanie Griffith how her father, Andy, was.

The absurdity of the questions Melendez asked was often amplified by the fact that he himself appeared to lack common pop culture knowledge and often did not even seem to know who the subjects of his interview were or why they were famous. Melendez would thus frequently be unaware of why his questions would provoke such angry reactions, such as when he asked Ally Sheedy if she had vomited lately, unaware that the actress suffered from bulimia. Some celebrities were a personal target of Stern's, such as Ted Williams, who was interviewed by Melendez because Stern disapproved of athletes charging money for autographs. Celebrities would often react angrily, but other times, they would take the questions in good humor.

Melendez notably interviewed Gennifer Flowers, Ringo Starr, and the Dalai Lama. At Gennifer Flowers' news conference playing the 'Clinton Tapes', he asked her if she planned to sleep with any other candidates before the election, to which she reacted by laughing. He asked the Dalai Lama if anyone ever greeted him with "Hello Dalai!", in a joking reference to the play and movie; the Dalai Lama's translator whispered the translation to the Dalai Lama, who chuckled. Another time Melendez interviewed Debbie Gibson about losing an award to Wilson Phillips, to which she jokingly agreed with his idea that "the fat one would eat the statue." Melendez also provided comic interest with his misadventures, poor grammar, and sloppy pronunciation.

National Exposure
Melendez started receiving national exposure in the early 1990s as Stern's syndicated morning radio show acquired more markets (including Los Angeles and Cleveland) and particularly from June 1994 when its condensed version began airing nightly on E!: Entertainment Television, a basic cable network with national coverage in the United States. In 1994, Melendez signed a record contract with Atlantic Records and released his self-titled album with a music video broadcast on MTV's Headbangers Ball. That year, he was being paid $20,000 annually by the Stern show, which had 15 million listeners.

During his 15-year run as Stern's employee, Melendez also starred in the Off-Broadway show Tony n' Tina's Wedding where he met his future wife, Suzanna. He appeared in such films as Airheads, Meet Wally Sparks, Dude, Where's My Car?, and Osmosis Jones, as well as Howard Stern's film Private Parts. He has also appeared on television in episodes of Wings, Baywatch Nights, and the 2003 United States version of the reality series I'm a Celebrity... Get Me Out Of Here!.

Melendez was also the protagonist of some of the show's more outrageous moments. In 2001, during A.J. Benza's appearance, Melendez got slapped in the face by Benza who did not appreciate the incessant lampooning of his failed late-night show, seeing Melendez as the main culprit. The on-air slap prompted an extended fracas and resulted in Benza being permanently banned from Stern's show.

Throughout the early part of 2002, Melendez and WXRK afternoon deejay Lee Mroszak (aka "Crazy Cabbie") had numerous on-air spats, which were used by Stern as fodder for multiple segments on the show. Their feud eventually culminated in a boxing match scheduled for Friday morning May 31, 2002, at Trump Taj Mahal in Atlantic City and was promoted on the show as "The Flunky versus the Junkie" with 2,500 tickets going on sale for $100 each. The 7 a.m. fight, essentially an extended segment on the show which itself was broadcast from around the ring that morning, was set for five two-minute rounds with a two-minute break in between each round. It went the distance, with the 175 lb Melendez winning over the 262 lb Cabbie by unanimous decision.

Following a guest appearance on The Tonight Show to promote I'm a Celebrity...Get Me Out of Here! in 2003, Melendez received an offer from Jay Leno to become the late-night show's New York 'correspondent' who would ask celebrities questions on the red carpet, similar to one of his roles on the Stern show. Melendez claimed that he turned down the offer because he could not get a private conversation with Stern to ask him about it. Stern later claimed how "lame" an idea it was for Leno to reuse Melendez the way Leno wanted to (in a less edgy way).

In parallel with his duties on the Stern show in the morning, Melendez got a daily afternoon show on New York City's WXRK (The Howard Stern Show flagship station) from noon to 1 pm called Out to Lunch, consisting mostly of taking musical requests by e-mail and playing them. The show was canceled on August 21, 2003, with Stern turning the announced cancellation into a 45-minute segment at the end of his live broadcast that day by having WXRK program director Robert Cross (aka Chuck Roast) come in and break the bad news on the air to Melendez.

Leaving the show
In February 2004, the New York Post revealed that Melendez had been offered the announcer position on The Tonight Show while Stern's show was on vacation. Many perceived the move as an attempt by Leno to attract a younger demographic. Melendez's offer, which was made without Stern's knowledge, prompted a rift between Stern and Leno. Stern berated Leno on his show for weeks on end, with insults such as "To an 18- to 25-year-old male, Jay Leno is gay. He might as well put a dress on," as well as accusations that Leno was "ripping him off."

Following Melendez's departure, Stern organized an on-air contest to find his replacement. Billed as "Win John's Job" (much like "Win Jackie's Money" after writer Jackie Martling walked out), the contest resulted in the hiring of Sal Governale (aka "Sal the Stockbroker") and Richard Christy, although for several years, L.A. radio disc-jockey "Scary Gary" (from 97.1 KSLX, which played Stern's radio show in Southern California) did Stuttering John style interviews that Stern would play on his show. Also, in his latter years on the Stern show, John had become too recognizable for the type of celebrity interviews for which he became niche-famous.

Comments since departure and relationship with Stern
On February 27, 2008, more than four years removed from his time on The Howard Stern Show,  Melendez was interviewed over the phone by Adam Carolla on his radio show with discussion of Melendez's 15 years as Stern's employee dominating the conversation. Carolla brought up the fact that on-air personnel on radio shows, even long-running hit shows, earn very low salaries compared to the show's host and wondered what kind of money Melendez made considering he was down in the show's pecking order, behind Stern, Robin Quivers, Fred, Jackie, and Gary. Melendez revealed that his first salary on The Howard Stern Show in 1990 was $10,000 per year, before adding that, much to his disappointment, he only got an additional $10,000 per year once the show began to be broadcast on E! in 1994.

Asked explicitly by Carolla if, considering that the station manager Tom Chiusano would not increase his salary, he ever thought, hoped, or expected that Stern (who earned more than $20 million per year) would "kick something down to [him]," Melendez answered:

In response, Stern devoted a 30-minute tirade to Melendez's comments with Carolla, calling the former employee a "no-talent ingrate" who should stick to holding up the mug on The Tonight Show. Stern commented, "I didn't have a beef with him before, but I do now. He's delusional. He can go fuck himself. I officially want nothing more to do with John. I've had it with him, and he's a talentless fuck. All he did was stutter. He just asked questions that we wrote for him."

Commenting on Melendez's claim that Stern did not like him doing side gigs away from Howard's show such as stand-up, rock music, and writing books, Stern retorted, "That's because they were horrible, and he was slapping my name on them." He also touched on the fact that Melendez's then-wife Suzanna and Stern's then-fiancée Beth are friends by saying he does not want them phoning each other anymore: "I'm going to have a talk with Beth about that." Stern also had choice words for Carolla over what he saw as a fellow radio host's attempt to get Melendez riled up: "He calls me 'Stern,' and I'm not sure what that's about".

2004–2014: Jay Leno's shows

The Tonight Show with Jay Leno
Melendez debuted on The Tonight Show on March 29, 2004, taking over for Edd Hall. On the show, he was identified simply as "John Melendez" as opposed to "Stuttering John."

In late September 2004, only six months after Melendez joined the show, NBC announced that Leno would be succeeded by Conan O'Brien in 2009. Throughout his first run on the Tonight Show, Melendez regularly appeared in the show's comedy sketches and did correspondent pieces.

The Jay Leno Show
In September 2009, Melendez reunited with Leno and former Tonight bandleader Kevin Eubanks as a member of the writing staff on The Jay Leno Show. Confirmation of his status on Leno's new prime time show came later than that of Eubanks, weeks after the end of Leno's tenure on The Tonight Show, which led to speculation that Melendez would not appear at all. Melendez's ambiguous job status prompted a sarcastic job offer from his former boss Stern.

When asked about Melendez's new role, Leno stated that Melendez would appear in comedy segments during the show and that the new show would not have a studio announcer (though Wally Wingert would later serve as show announcer). On The Tonight Show, Leno described his interplay with Melendez as "awkward," saying "I'd throw to Kevin Eubanks, and I'd throw to John, and I realized that my guy is Eubanks."

Return of The Tonight Show with Jay Leno
With the return of Leno's The Tonight Show in March 2010, Melendez continued in the writing role, which he had previously performed on The Jay Leno Show. Melendez did not return as an announcer on the second incarnation of The Tonight Show with Jay Leno (the job went to Wally Wingert), but instead was employed as a staff writer and occasional on-air segment host until Leno's departure from The Tonight Show on February 6, 2014.

2014–present: Other projects
On November 4, 2015, Melendez announced that he had become the executive producer and an on-air contributor to The Stephanie Miller Show, a progressive radio talk show. His role was later reduced to one hour per week on Fridays, and as of fall 2016, he is no longer part of the show.

Melendez announced in 2017 that he would be running for U.S. Senate for California against incumbent Dianne Feinstein for the 2018 election. It was later reported that he had withdrawn.

The Stuttering John Podcast and Trump prank call
In April 2018, he launched his new podcast, The Stuttering John Podcast. During Melendez's podcast on June 28, 2018, he prank-called the White House by pretending to be an assistant to Senator from New Jersey, Bob Menendez. Melendez ultimately received a call back from President Donald Trump as he was traveling on Air Force One. Melendez then impersonated Senator Menendez and had a four-minute conversation focusing on immigration reform and the Supreme Court vacancy. Notably, President Trump was congratulatory regarding the outcome of Senator Menendez's ethics lawsuit. The White House has confirmed the security breach.

On July 2, 2018, Melendez announced that he had retained lawyer Michael Avenatti to represent him in relation to the prank call after being visited by Secret Service agents over the previous weekend.

Published work
Melendez's book Easy for You to Say was released in October 2018.

Personal life
After moving to California in 2004 to work on The Tonight Show, Melendez lived in Calabasas with his wife Suzanna Keller and their three children. The couple filed for separation in October 2011 and divorced in 2012.

Discography
Albums
 Stuttering John (Atlantic Records, 1994)
 Everybody's Normal But Me (Razor & Tie, 1998)

Singles
 Gypsy Morning (Atlantic Records, 1994)
 I'll Talk My Way Out of It (Atlantic Records, 1995)
 Strawberry Fields Forever (Jellyfish, 1995)
 Pretty Girl (Razor & Tie, 1998)

Filmography
Actor
 Airheads (1994)
 Wings 
 Olive or Twist (1996) 
 Baywatch Nights (1996)
 Thin Blood (1996) 
 Private Parts (1997)
 Meet Wally Sparks (1997)
 Dude, Where's My Car? (2000)
 Osmosis Jones (2001)
 True Crime: New York City (2005)
 Tripping the Rift: The Movie (2008) 
 One, Two, Many (2008)
 Not Another Not Another Movie (2012)

Writer
 The Howard Stern Radio Show One, Two, Many (2008)
 The Tonight Show with Jay Leno (2010–2014)

See also

List of Puerto Ricans

References

External links
 
 'Stuttering' John to announce 'Tonight Show'. USA Today, 2004-02-19.  Retrieved on 2008-03-02.
 Grammy Out of Control. Rolling Stone Magazine'' 1997-01-07.  Retrieved on 2008-03-02.

1965 births
Living people
American male film actors
American male voice actors
American podcasters
American people of Danish descent
American people of Puerto Rican descent
Candidates in the 2018 United States Senate elections
Participants in American reality television series
People from Massapequa, New York
Radio personalities from New York City
Radio and television announcers
American television writers
American male television writers
Hispanic and Latino American male actors
People from Plainedge, New York
Tisch School of the Arts alumni
Screenwriters from New York (state)